A military training area, training area (Australia, Ireland, UK) or training centre (Canada) is land set aside specifically to enable military forces to train and exercise for combat. Training areas are usually out of bounds to the general public, but some have limited access when not in use. As well as their military function, they often serve as important wildlife refuges. They are distinct from proving grounds which are designed for purposes such as testing weaponry or equipment.

Description 
Military training areas are important because they enable troops to train more realistically and in greater numbers over a wide area without unduly inconveniencing the public or putting others at risk. They are particularly important for all arms training where the different elements of armed forces come together to cooperate and coordinate their fire and movement. Training areas often incorporate a variety of terrain types, including forests, heathland, waterbodies and farmland, as well as urban training facilities such as the 'Afghan village' at Thetford on Stanford Training Area. Such training areas are run by the military and are normally out-of-bounds to the public who may sometimes be allowed access during weekends or holidays. Training areas may incorporate firing ranges or designated areas where live firing is permitted.

Wildlife 
Military training areas are often important wildlife refuges and can make a "significant contribution to conservation... if properly managed." This is because they comprise large tracts of countryside with restricted access and are free from development, cultivation or other exploitative activities. They typically divide into areas that are regularly disturbed by vehicle traffic or weapons such as bombs and missiles and areas that are relatively undisturbed.

Military training areas are home to some of our most endangered species of animals and plants "precisely because they are used by the military." In the US, 21% of endangered species live on DoD land which forms only 3% of the country. A Polish study showed that the training was not significantly detrimental to biodiversity. The major factor in this was the lack of human intervention for lengthy periods of time.

In Germany, it has been found that wolves moving into new areas will invariably settle first in military training areas before spreading out. This may be because there is less poaching and the hunting areas tend to be far larger than those on private land, so they are less easy to find.

Training areas by country

Asia

Singapore 
 Ama Keng Training Area
 Sungei Gedong Training Area
 Southern Islands Live-Firing Area (SILFA)

Australasia

Australia
 Bindoon Military Training Area, Bindoon, Western Australia
 Bradshaw Field Training Area – Timber Creek, Northern Territory
 Buckland Military Training Area, near Hobart, Tasmania
 Cowley Beach Training Area - Cowley Beach, Queensland
 Lancelin Training Area, Lancelin, Western Australia
 Kangaroo Flats Training Area – Berry Springs, Northern Territory
 Mount Bundey Training Area - Mount Bundey, Northern Territory
 Murray Bridge Training Area, South Australia
 Shoalwater Bay Military Training Area, Shoalwater Bay, Queensland (4545 km2)

Europe

Austria
Austria has had important training areas since the 18th century. From 1938 the German Wehrmacht established new training areas, the largest being Döllersheim (now Allentsteig) Training Area in the Waldviertel. Other areas in use today include:
 Allentsteig, Lower Austria (157 km2), largest training area in Austria
 Bruckneudorf, Lower Austria
 Glainach, Carinthia
 Großmittel, Lower Austria
 Hochfilzen, Tyrol
 Marwiesen, Carinthia
 Lizum-Walchen, Tyrol (50 km2)
 Pöls, Styria
 Seetaler Alpen, Styria

Czech Republic

There are five military training areas (MTAs) in the Czech Republic with the total area of 1296 km2. They are run by "Military Regions" and have been used since 1994 for joint exercises and training between the Czech armed forces and its allies. This was initially carried out as part of Partnership for Peace Programme and subsequently with NATO. In addition, since 2001, the armed forces of Austria, Belgium, France, Hungary, the Netherlands and the US have conducted national exercises on Czech MTAs.

 Boletice Military Training Area
 Libavá Military Training Area
 Ralsko Military Training Area

Denmark
 Borris Skydeterræn (47 km2)

Finland
 Rovajärvi training area near Rovaniemi in Lapland is the largest of its kind in Northern Europe.
 The Artillery Brigade in Niinisalo, currently housing the Finnish ordnance R&D centre (established 1921)

Germany

 Bergen-Hohne Training Area, Lower Saxony (284 km2), NATO facility, largest training area in Germany
 Grafenwöhr, Bavaria (229 km2) a US facility
 Hammelburg, Bavaria (40 km2), featuring a complete artificial village for German Army training
 Hohenfels, Bavaria (160 km2) 
 Heuberg Training Area, Baden-Württemberg
 Munster Training Area, Lower Saxony
 Sennelager Training Area, North Rhine-Westphalia, managed by the British Army
 Vogelsang Training Area, in the Eifel, NRW
 Wildflecken Training Area in Bavaria

Ireland 
 Glen of Imaal (27 km2), an Irish Army artillery, live fire, and tactical training area

Italy
Salto di Quirra (120 km2), an Italian interforce training area on Sardinia

Poland
 Drawsko Training Ground (340 km2), belonging to the Polish Army and Air Force since 1946 and also used by NATO since 1996. This facility is internationally known as DPTA (Drawsko Pomorskie Training Area). It is also an important archeological excavation site.
 Ośrodek Szkolenia Poligonowego Wojsk Lądowych Żagań (about 34,000 ha) in Żagań County and Bolesławiec County, belonging to the Polish Land Forces and also used by NATO

Portugal
 Alcochete (75 km2), an artillery and air bombing range. Established in 1904, it was managed by the Portuguese Army until 1993 and since then is managed by the Portuguese Air Force. It is the largest closed military facility in Europe. In 2008, it was chosen to be the site of the future New Lisbon International Airport.

Spain

 Chinchilla, Albacete (CENAD Chinchilla), 232 km2
 San Gregorio, Zaragoza (CENAD San Gregorio), 340 km2

United Kingdom
The UK has six regional training areas and twenty two overseas training areas.
 Bronaber Training Area, Wales
 Salisbury Plain Training Area (380 km2)
 Stanford Training Area (STANTA), Norfolk (120 km2), established 1942, includes an "Afghan" village
 Otterburn Training Area, Northumberland (242 km2)

North America

Canada
CFB Suffield, Alberta (2690 km2), training base for the Canadian Forces and British Army
Canadian Forces Base Wainwright, Alberta (609 km2), home of the Land Force Western Area Training Centre (LFWATC) and Canadian Manoeuvre Training Centre (CMTC)
CFB Shilo, Manitoba (400 km2), home station of the Royal Regiment of Canadian Artillery
Land Force Central Area Training Centre Meaford, Ontario (68 km2), training centre for the 4th Canadian Division
Garrison Petawawa, Ontario (307 km2), home of 2 CMBG and 4th CDSG
CFB Valcartier, Quebec (28 km2), home of 5 CMBG
CFB Gagetown, New Brunswick (1100 km2), the primary Eastern Canada training area
Land Force Atlantic Area Training Centre Aldershot, Nova Scotia (11.4 km2)

Footnotes

References

Literature 
 Dudley, Marianna (2012). An Environmental History of the UK Defence Estate, 1945 to the Present. Bloomsbury.